The Institute of Education building is a Grade II* listed building by Denys Lasdun and Partners in the London Borough of Camden used by the University College London Institute of Education.

Gallery

References

External links

Grade II* listed buildings in the London Borough of Camden
Educational buildings
Brutalist architecture in England